123 Mission Street, sometimes referenced as the Pacific Gas & Electric Building, is a  29 floor skyscraper in the SOMA neighborhood of San Francisco, California, completed in 1986. The tower was developed by Shorenstein Properties and designed by Skidmore, Owings & Merrill.

In 2018, Northwood Investors of New York bought the building $290 million."

History
Completed in 1986, the tower was developed by Shorenstein Properties and designed by Skidmore, Owings & Merrill.

It was owned by Northwood, LLC, which acquired it for $300 million from the Chinese insurance company, HNA Group in 2018. Juul announced in June 2019 that it had purchased 123 Mission Street, while maintaining an existing space on Pier 70. The deal was "one of the largest in San Francisco history for a tech company that doesn't specialize in real estate." The building was worth an estimated $400 million.

In November 2019, Juul laid off 23 employees at its new 123 Mission Street Office and was considering selling the building, which it had acquired for $397 million.

Features
The tower is 28 stories, with 363,000 square feet of real estate.

See also

List of tallest buildings in San Francisco

References

External links

Office buildings completed in 1986
Skyscraper office buildings in San Francisco
Skidmore, Owings & Merrill buildings
South of Market, San Francisco